Seo Seong-jun (born 25 January 1971) is a South Korean fencer. He competed in the individual and team sabre events at the 1996 Summer Olympics.

References

External links
 

1971 births
Living people
South Korean male sabre fencers
Olympic fencers of South Korea
Fencers at the 1996 Summer Olympics
Asian Games medalists in fencing
Fencers at the 1998 Asian Games
Fencers at the 2002 Asian Games
Korea National Sport University alumni
Asian Games gold medalists for South Korea
Medalists at the 1998 Asian Games
Medalists at the 2002 Asian Games